The H'San Natall are a fictional alien race that has appeared in various comic books published by DC Comics.

Publication history
The H'San Natall first appeared in Teen Titans (Vol. 2) #1 and were created by Dan Jurgens and George Pérez.

Fictional species biography
The H'San Natall are a dangerous and dominating alien race that had conquered planets that number to the thousands. The H'San Natall also employed bio-genetic tactics in their invasion plans. Years ago, the H'San Natall had enslaved a group of Psion scientists who performed a number of genetic experiments. One of these experiments resulted in the bio-engineering of elite warriors with one of them being the shapeshifting bounty hunter Jugular. The H'San Natall had also developed breeding experiments to help in their plans. They are primarily known for abducting and impregnating nine human females to further their plans. All but one female (who later became Queen) were released with the memories of their experiments wiped from their memories. Nine months later on June 21, the human/H'San Natall hybrids were born and were to serve as the H'San Natall's sleeper agents for their upcoming invasion. When it came to their 16th birthdays, the H'San Natall planned to abduct the children they created and bring them back to the planet Titan for mental conditioning and then take over the Earth. They only succeeded in capturing Isaiah Crockett, Toni Monetti, and Cody Driscoll. Just before Isaiah Crockett was abducted, Atom (who was reverted to a teenager at the time) was caught in the energy stream and was transported as well. Once on the alien ship, they met and rescued another human/H'San Natall hybrid named Prysm who had been raised in a virtual reality environment. Atom and the teenagers escaped from the H'San Natall ship while evading Jugular in the process. Each of the teenagers had developed superpowers and joined up with Atom to form the new incarnation of the Teen Titans.

The H'San Natall used the anti-alien group known as the Veil as their front when it comes to discrediting the Teen Titans and capturing them. One of their goals involved killing Scorcher of Dark Nemesis (who was also a human/H'San Natall) and framing Risk. The Teen Titans were able to find evidence that cleared Risk of the murder charges. The Teen Titans are hunted by Deathstroke who ended up capturing them and bring them to the H'San Natall. Once there, Prysm discovers her mother, known as Queen Miraset, is alive and living among the H’San Natall. Prysm also meets her father King Ch'Ah who has a glasslike appearance similar to Prysm. Pylon reveals the H'San Natall used a group called the Veil as a front for their objectives. On the outside, the Veil was an organization with one objective: Eliminate all alien influence from the planet Earth. In actuality, its leader Pylon was a member of the H'San Natall. Before the H'San Natall can reprogram the human/H'San Natall hybrids to begin their invasion of Earth, the Teen Titans are then saved upon the arrival of Captain Marvel Jr., Changeling, and Superman. Although King Ch'Ah wanted to bring their children back to their homeworld, Superman threatened to bring their mothership down if they continued any further acts of aggression. King Ch'Ah stood down. The Teen Titans and Superman were able to talk the H'San Natall out of further acts of aggression. While the Teen Titans returned to Earth, Prysm and Fringe decided to stay with the H'San Natall.

H'San Natall classes
The H'San Natall is composed of different classes ranging from:
 Ruling Class - The H'San Natall Class that rules the H'San Natall.
 Technocrats -
 Warrior Class - The H'San Natall Class that is trained in fighting.
 Workers -

References

External links
 H'San Natall at DC Comics Wiki
 H'San Natall at Comic Vine
 H'San Natall at Titanstower.com

DC Comics alien species